The 2019 Africa U-20 Cup of Nations was the 15th edition of the Africa U-20 Cup of Nations (22nd edition if tournaments without hosts are included), the biennial international youth football tournament organized by the Confederation of African Football (CAF) for players aged 20 and below. In May 2015, it was decided that the tournament would be hosted by Niger.

The top four teams of the tournament qualified for the 2019 FIFA U-20 World Cup in Poland as the CAF representatives. Mali won their first title, while the other qualified teams which finished second to fourth were Senegal, South Africa and Nigeria. Defending champions Zambia failed to qualify.

Qualification

The qualifiers were played between 30 March and 12 August 2018. At the end of the qualification phase, seven teams joined the hosts Niger.

Player eligibility
Players born 1 January 1999 or later are eligible to participate in the competition.

Qualified teams
The following eights teams qualified for the final tournament.

Note: All appearance statistics count only those since the introduction of final tournament in 1991.

Venues
The matches were played in two venues:

Squads

Each squad can contain a maximum of 21 players.

Draw
The draw of the final tournament was held on 13 December 2018, 21:00 WAT (UTC+1), at the Centre Technique de La Fenifoot in Niamey. The eight teams were drawn into two groups of four teams. The hosts Niger were seeded in Group A and allocated to position A1, while 2017 runners-up Senegal were seeded in Group B and allocated to position B1 (2017 champions Zambia did not qualify). The remaining six teams were seeded based on their results in the 2017 Africa U-20 Cup of Nations (final tournament and qualifiers), and drawn to any of the remaining three positions in each group.

Match officials
A total of 12 referees and 12 assistant referees were appointed for the tournament.

Referees
 Pacifique Ndabihawenimana (Burundi)
 Antoine Effa (Cameroon)
 Souleiman Ahmed Djama (Djibouti)
 Amin Mohamed Amin Mohamed Omar (Egypt)
 Peter Waweru (Kenya)
 Boubou Traoré (Mali)
 Imtehaz Heeralall (Mauritius)
 Ali Mohamed Moussa (Niger)
 Jean Claude Ishimwe (Rwanda)
 Hassan Mohamed Hagi (Somalia)
 Kokou Ntalé (Togo)
 Haythem Guirat (Tunisia)

Assistant Referees
 Abdoulaziz Yacouba (Niger)
 Jospin Luckner Malonga (Central African Republic)
 Samir Gamal Saad Mohamed (Egypt)
 Firmino Bassafim (Guinea-Bissau)
 Lionel Hasinjarasoa (Madagascar)
 Fabien Cauvelet (Mauritius)
 Mustapha Akerkad (Morocco)  
 Mathew Kanyanga (Namibia)
 Abdoul Aziz Moctar Saley (Niger)
 Hamza Hagi Abdi (Somalia)
 Dick Okello (Uganda)
 Samuel Temesgin Atango (Ethiopia)

Group stage
The top two teams of each group advance to the semi-finals and qualify for the 2019 FIFA U-20 World Cup.

Tiebreakers
Teams are ranked according to points (3 points for a win, 1 point for a draw, 0 points for a loss), and if tied on points, the following tiebreaking criteria are applied, in the order given, to determine the rankings (Regulations Article 71):
Points in head-to-head matches among tied teams;
Goal difference in head-to-head matches among tied teams;
Goals scored in head-to-head matches among tied teams;
If more than two teams are tied, and after applying all head-to-head criteria above, a subset of teams are still tied, all head-to-head criteria above are reapplied exclusively to this subset of teams;
Goal difference in all group matches;
Goals scored in all group matches;
Drawing of lots.

All times are local, WAT (UTC+1).

Group A

Group B

Knockout stage
In the knockout stage, extra time and penalty shoot-out are used to decide the winner if necessary, except for the third place match where penalty shoot-out (no extra time) is used to decide the winner if necessary (Regulations Article 72).

Bracket

Semi-finals

Third place match

Final

Winners

Goalscorers
3 goals

 Youssouph Mamadou Badji
 Amadou Dia N'Diaye

2 goals

 Daniel Lomotey
 Mamadou Traoré

1 goal

 Abdoul Tapsoba
 Saidi Irakoze
 Bienvenue Kanakimana
 Jules Ulimwengu
 Boubacar Traoré
 Hadji Dramé
 Kairou Amoustapha
 Boubacar Goumey
 Mahamadou Sabo
 Issah Salou
 Ibrahim Alhassan
 Paschal Durugbor
 Maxwell Effiom
 Nazifi Yahaya
 Samba Diallo
 Dion Lopy
 Faly Ndaw
 Ousseynou Niang
 Luke Le Roux
 Siphesihle Mkhize

1 own goal

 Givemore Khupe (against Senegal)

Awards
Top scorer
 Amadou Dia N'Diaye

Player of the tournament 
 Moussa N'Diaye

Fair Play Award

Qualified teams for FIFA U-20 World Cup
The following four teams from CAF qualified for the 2019 FIFA U-20 World Cup.

1 Bold indicates champions for that year. Italic indicates hosts for that year.

Notes

References

External links
21st Edition TOTAL U-20 Africa Cup Of Nations, Niger 2019, CAFonline.com

 
U-20 Cup of Nations
Africa U-20 Cup of Nations
2019 FIFA U-20 World Cup qualification
2019
2019 Africa U-20 Cup of Nations
February 2019 sports events in Africa